The year 2003 is the seventh year in the history of M-1 Global, a mixed martial arts promotion based in Russia. In 2003 M-1 Global held five events between April and December.

Events list

M-1 MFC: Russia vs. The World 5

M-1 MFC: Russia vs. The World 5 was an event held on April 6, 2003 at Sports Hall "Jubileiniy" in Saint Petersburg, Russia.

Results

M-1 MFC: Northwest Open Cup

M-1 MFC: Northwest Open Cup was an event held on May 22, 2003 in Saint Petersburg, Russia.

Results

M-1 MFC: Russia vs. Ukraine

M-1 MFC: Russia vs. Ukraine was an event held on June 17, 2003 at The Casino Conti Giant Hall in Saint Petersburg, Russia.

Results

M-1 MFC: Russia vs. The World 6

M-1 MFC: Russia vs. The World 6 was an event held on October 10, 2003 in Moscow, Russia.

Results

M-1 MFC: Russia vs. The World 7

M-1 MFC: Russia vs. The World 7 was an event held on December 5, 2003 in Saint Petersburg, Russia.

Results

See also 
 M-1 Global

References

M-1 Global events
2003 in mixed martial arts